Gran pensión La Alegría is a 1942 Argentine comedy-drama film directed by Julio Irigoyen.

Cast

External links
 

1942 films
1940s musical comedy-drama films
1940s Spanish-language films
Argentine black-and-white films
Films directed by Julio Irigoyen
Argentine musical comedy-drama films
1942 comedy films
1942 drama films
1940s Argentine films